Nathan Palafoz de Sousa (born 4 August 1999), simply known as Nathan, is a Brazilian footballer who plays as a forward for FK Riteriai.

Club career
Nathan was born in Rio de Janeiro, and began his career at Nova Iguaçu at the age of 15. He made his first team debut on 18 January 2017, coming on as a second-half substitute in a 2–2 Campeonato Carioca away draw against Campos.

On 26 June 2017, Nathan moved on loan to Corinthians, being initially assigned to the under-20s. He was bought outright in April 2019, and renewed his contract until 2023 on 29 July 2020.

On 12 August 2020, Nathan joined Spanish Segunda División B side Racing de Ferrol on loan. His loan was extended for a further year in July 2021, but he was mainly used as a substitute.

On 15 July 2022, after returning from loan, Nathan signed for fellow Série A side Avaí until the end of the year, also in a temporary deal. He made his debut in the category four days later, replacing Eduardo in a 1–0 away loss against Ceará.

Career statistics

References

External links

Avaí profile 

1999 births
Living people
Brazilian footballers
Footballers from Rio de Janeiro (city)
Association football forwards
Campeonato Brasileiro Série A players
Primera Federación players
Segunda División B players
Nova Iguaçu Futebol Clube players
Sport Club Corinthians Paulista players
Racing de Ferrol footballers
Avaí FC players
Brazilian expatriate footballers
Brazilian expatriate sportspeople in Spain
Expatriate footballers in Spain